Tow is a surname in various cultures.

Origins
Tow may be:
 A spelling, based on the pronunciations in some varieties of Chinese, of the Chinese surnames romanised in Mandarin Pinyin as Táo, Cáo, or Dù
Other variants include Towe.

Statistics
According to statistics cited by Patrick Hanks, 78 people on the island of Great Britain and none on the island of Ireland bore the surname Tow in 2011. In 1881 there had been 148 people with the surname in Great Britain, primarily at Lincolnshire, West Riding of Yorkshire, and Leicestershire.

The 2010 United States Census found 1,910 people with the surname Tow, making it the 15,355th-most-common name in the country. This represented an increase in absolute numbers, but a decrease in relative frequency, from 1,893 (14,457th-most-common) in the 2000 Census. In both censuses, about four-fifths of the bearers of the surname identified as White, and between 10% and 15% as Asian.

People
People with the surname Tow include:
Timothy Tow (1920–2009), Singaporean pastor
Leonard Tow (born 1928), American businessman
Eng Tow (born 1947), Singaporean artist
Jeff Tow-Arnett (born 1986), American football fullback
Matthew J. Tow, Australian singer
Michael Tow, American actor, director, and producer

See also
Töws, a German surname
Isaac N'Tow (born 1994), Ghanaian footballer

References

Surnames of English origin
Surnames of Scottish origin
Chinese-language surnames
Multiple Chinese surnames